Mindhunter (also known as Aliens/Predator/Witchblade/The Darkness: Mindhunter, Witchblade/Aliens/The Darkness/Predator: Mindhunter, etc.) is a three-issue comic book miniseries published by Dark Horse Comics.

It features a crossover between the comic book characters Witchblade and the Darkness as well as the film properties Aliens and Predator. The series was written by David Quinn, with pencils by Mel Rubi, inks by Mike Perkins and cover art by Eric Kohler.

References

External links

Alien vs. Predator (franchise) comics
Comics based on films
Dark Horse Comics limited series
Image Comics limited series
Intercompany crossovers
Top Cow titles
Witchblade